Vostochny is a rural locality (a village) in Abitovsky Selsoviet, Meleuzovsky District, Bashkortostan, Russia. The population was 328 as of 2010. There are 11 streets.

Geography 
Vostochny is located 31 km east of Meleuz (the district's administrative centre) by road. Basurmanovka is the nearest rural locality.

References 

Rural localities in Meleuzovsky District